Glucono-delta-lactone (GDL), also known as gluconolactone, is a food additive with the E-number E575 used as a sequestrant, an acidifier, or a curing, pickling, or leavening agent. It is a lactone of D-gluconic acid. Pure GDL is a white odorless crystalline powder.

GDL has been marketed for use in feta cheese. GDL is pH-neutral, but hydrolyses in water to gluconic acid which is acidic, adding a tangy taste to foods, though it has roughly a third of the sourness of citric acid. It is metabolized to 6-phospho-D-gluconate; one gram of GDL yields roughly the same amount of metabolic energy as one gram of sugar.

Upon addition to water, GDL is partially hydrolysed to gluconic acid, with the balance between the lactone form and the acid form established as a chemical equilibrium. The rate of hydrolysis of GDL is increased by heat and high pH.

The yeast Saccharomyces bulderi can be used to ferment gluconolactone to ethanol and carbon dioxide. The pH value greatly affects culture growth. Gluconolactone at 1 or 2% in a mineral media solution causes the pH to drop below 3.

It is also a complete inhibitor of the enzyme amygdalin beta-glucosidase at concentrations of 1 mM.

See also 
Glucuronolactone

References 

Food acidity regulators
Curing agents
Delta-lactones
Pickling agents
Leavening agents
Sequestrants
Garde manger
Tetrahydropyrans
E-number additives